Appalachian Gospel is the sixth studio album by singer Stella Parton.

Track listing
The track listing is as follows:

Amazing Grace
Leaning On The Everlasting Arms
Farther Along
Keep On The Firing Line
Precious Memories
In The Sweet Bye And Bye
Power In The Blood (Medley)
What A Friend We Have In Jesus
Pass Me Not O Gentle Saviour
This Little Light Of Mine (Medley)
He Set Me Free
Just A Little Talk With Jesus
Somebody Touched Me (Medley)

References

2003 albums
Stella Parton albums